Ziffer is a surname. Notable people with the surname include:

Benny Ziffer (born 1953), Israeli writer and journalist
Frances Ziffer (1917-1996) American composer, conductor and pianist
Irit Ziffer (born 1954), Israeli archaeologist and art historian
Moshe Ziffer (1902–1989), Israeli artist and sculptor)
Sándor Ziffer (1880–1962), Hungarian painter
Tommaso Ziffer, Italian architect and interior designer
Wolfgang Ziffer (1941-2022), German voice actor and actor